Daniel Alfred Yock (1975–1993) was an Australian aboriginal youth. Born on 7 February 1975 at Cherbourg Aboriginal Settlement, he was a dancer, and founder of the Wakka Wakka Dance Company troupe. On 7 November 1993, in Brisbane, he was killed by six police officers for no given reasons.

References

Bibliography
 Berghofer, Greg. ‘Aboriginal Community Farewells Daniel.’ South Burnett Times (Kingaroy, Qld), 19 November 1993, 3
 Courier-Mail (Brisbane). ‘Police Demand Apology.’ 6 April 1994, 1
 Fogarty, Lionel. ‘Musgrave Park: Lionel Fogarty Talks to Philip Mead.’ RePublica (Sydney), no. 3 (1995): 119–31
 Queensland. A Report of an Investigation into the Arrest and Death of Daniel Alfred Yock. Brisbane: Criminal Justice Commission, 1994
 The Truth About the Killing of Daniel Yock: Workers Inquiry Exposes Police Murder. Marrickville, NSW: Labour Press Books, 1994

1975 births
1993 deaths
20th-century Australian dancers
Aboriginal peoples of Queensland
Deaths in police custody in Australia